Keshabad-e Sofla (also Romanized as Keshābād-e Soflá; also known as Keshābād) is a village in Eqbal-e Gharbi Rural District, in the Central District of Qazvin County, Qazvin Province, Iran. At the 2006 census, its population was 50, in 21 families.

References 

Populated places in Qazvin County